Khakriz or Khak Riz may refer to:
 Khakrez, Afghanistan
 Khakriz, Ardabil
 Khakriz, Hamadan
 Khakriz, Zanjan